I Want It All may refer to:
"I Want It All" (Queen song), 1989
I Want It All (album), a 1999 album by Warren G
"I Want It All" (Warren G song), 1999
"I Want It All" (Dangerous Muse song), 2009
"I Want It All" (High School Musical song), 2008 
"I Want It All" (Eve's Plum song), 1993
"I Want It All" (Karmin song), 2014
"I Want It All", a song by Krokus from their album Rock the Block
"I Want It All", a 2005 song by Depeche Mode from the album Playing the Angel
 "I Want It All", a 2013 song by Arctic Monkeys from the album AM
 "I Want It All", a song by Eurythmics from the album Peace (Eurythmics album)
 "I Want It All", a song by Trans Am from the album Red Line (album)
 "I Want It All," a song from the soundtrack to the 2014 movie Barbie and the Secret Door
 "I Want It All", a song by The Wanted from the album Battleground